Water Music, TWV 55:C3, is the common name of an orchestral suite by the German Baroque composer Georg Philipp Telemann, with the full title  (Hamburg ebb and flood).

The suite draws upon Hamburg's geographical location as an important and successful port on the river Elbe while Telemann illustrates the piece with mythological water deities and tone painting giving the nautical theme added depth. The overture begins by representing the physical movement of the ocean, followed by several dance movements: first, the sleeping sea goddess Thetis, the mother of Achilles, who then awakes; the sea god Neptune in love; playful water nymphs known as Naiads; Neptune's son and sea messenger Triton joking; Aeolus, ruler of the winds; and Zephir, god of the west wind. Two final pieces follow, one depicting the tides of Hamburg and finally, its happy sailors.

Movements
 Ouverture in C major
 Sarabande:  (The sleeping Thetis)
 Bourrée:  (Thetis awakening)
 Loure:  (Neptune in love)
 Gavotte:  (Playing Naiads)
 Harlequinade:  (The joking Triton)
 Tempête:  (The stormy Aeolus)
 Menuett:  (The pleasant Zephir)
 Gigue:  (Ebb and Flow)
 Canarie:  (The merry Boat People)

References

External links
 
 

1723 compositions
 Compositions in C major
Orchestral suites
Suites by Georg Philipp Telemann
Music in Hamburg
Classical mythology in music